Yüreğir Cultural Centre, is a complex in the Yüreğir district of Adana, that is composed of three conference halls. The centre is built in the Seljuk architecture, next to a park in the Kazım Karabekir neighbourhood.

Yüreğir Cultural Centre has the largest hall in Adana, with 1000-seater capacity, and it is used mostly for conferences. The other two halls, 200-seater both, are for conferences and weddings.

Gallery

References

Culture in Adana
Buildings and structures in Adana